Mithra Patera is a patera, or a complex crater with scalloped edges, on Jupiter's moon Io. It is named after the Persian god of light, Mithra. Its name was adopted by the International Astronomical Union in 1985. To the north is Silpian Mons, and to the east is Pyerun Patera. Located southwest is Viracocha Patera.

References

Surface features of Io (moon)